The FuMO 21 ("Radio-direction finder, active ranging") was designed in 1941 as a search radar for Nazi Germany's Kriegsmarine, suitable for ships between light cruiser and large torpedo boats in size. First designated FMG 39G(gL), it received its final designation when the Kriegsmarine revised its radar nomenclature system around 1943. It was derived from the earlier Seetakt search radar and had an antenna  in size.

Notes

Citations

Bibliography

 

World War II German radars
Naval radars
Military equipment introduced from 1940 to 1944